Deh Salar-e Yek (also Romanized as Deh Sālār-e Yek; also known as Deh-e Sālār and Deh Sālār) is a village in Dehsard Rural District, in the Central District of Arzuiyeh County, Kerman Province, Iran. At the 2006 census, its population was 92, in 26 families.

References 

Populated places in Arzuiyeh County